Liberal People's Party may refer to:

Liberal People's Party (Denmark); Liberalt Folkeparti 
Liberal People's Party (Finland); Liberaalinen Kansanpuolue
Liberal People's Party (Norway, 1972); Det Liberale Folkepartiet
Liberal People's Party (Norway); Det Liberale Folkepartiet
Liberal People's Party (Sweden); Folkpartiet Liberalerna

See also
List of liberal parties